Paul Bonhomme (born 22 September 1964) is a British aerobatics and commercial airliner pilot and owner/race pilot of Team Bonhomme, the Red Bull Air Race World Champion for 2015.

Racing career
Bonhomme was born into a family of aviators. His father was an airline pilot and his mother worked as a flight attendant. His brother is a commercial pilot.

Bonhomme's flying career started in 1980 at White Waltham Airfield as a general dogsbody by cleaning hangars, polishing aircraft and refuelling aircraft.

At age 18 he gained his Private Pilot Licence taking first the FAA licence at Redbird Airfield near Dallas, Texas and subsequently became a flight instructor. In 1985 he became an air taxi pilot and in 1987 joined Air Cymru, a Welsh charter airline, flying the Boeing 737. He now flies as a captain of Boeing 747s for British Airways.

His aerobatics career started in 1986, flying an Ultimate Pitts. He went on to fly the Yak-50, Extra 300 and then the Sukhoi Su-26 in 1991 for Richard Goode Aerobatics. He has flown over 650 public displays and flies vintage fighters for "The Old Flying Machine Company" at Duxford Aerodrome.

Aircraft types Bonhomme has flown include the Supermarine Spitfire (MkV, MkIX, MkIXT and MkXIV), Hawker Hurricane, P-40 Kittyhawk, F4F Wildcat, F6F Hellcat, F8F Bearcat, P-47 Thunderbolt, P-63 Kingcobra, Hawker Sea Fury II, P-51 Mustang and AD-4 Skyraider.

Since 1994 he has been flying formation displays around the world with his colleague former Air Race pilot and Television commentator Steve Jones as "The Matadors". They won three gold medals and one silver medal in the FAI series. He has competed in the Red Bull Air Race World Championship from its inception in 2003 until 2015, achieving an unsurpassed record of 46 podium finishes out of 65 races that includes 19 race wins.

Awards
In 2010 Paul was awarded the Guild Sword of Honour by the Guild of Air Pilots and Air Navigators.

Bonhomme was the 2009 recipient of the Segrave Trophy.

Personal life
Bonhomme's hobbies include flying his own Robinson R22 Helicopter. He is married with a stepson and three daughters, and lives in South Cambridgeshire, England.

Legend:
 CAN: Cancelled
 DNP: Did not participate
 DNS: Did not show
 DQ: Disqualified
 NC: Not classified

See also
 Competition aerobatics
 Red Bull Air Race World Series

References

External links

 Home page of Paul Bonhomme
 Channel 4
 Aerobatic displays
 Aerobatics website
 Red Bull Air Race World Series official website

1964 births
Living people
English aviators
British air racers
Aerobatic pilots
Red Bull Air Race World Championship pilots
Red Bull Air Race World Championship winners
Britannia Trophy winners
Segrave Trophy recipients
Commercial aviators